Ivan Yuryevich Kulakov (born July 15, 1967) is a Russian geophysicist and artist.

Kulakov was born in Novosibirsk in Siberia. During his childhood Ivan visited the lectures his father Professor Yury Kulakov conducted on both classical and contemporary art. The museums of the former Soviet Union, along with the paintings and photographs his father showed him, have had a significant influence on Kulakov's art. Today he says that these lectures were much more important to his development as an artist than any school of arts or university could have been.
The symbiosis of his scientific career and art career has allowed Kulakov to exhibit in many countries.

External links
Иван Кулаков: "Никогда не рассматриваю картину как элемент дизайна" 

20th-century Russian painters
Russian male painters
21st-century Russian painters
Russian geophysicists
1967 births
Living people
Artists from Novosibirsk
20th-century Russian male artists
21st-century Russian male artists